Begumabad Budhana is a census town in Ghaziabad district  in the state of Uttar Pradesh, India.

Demographics
 India census, Begumabad Budhana had a population of 16,248. Males constitute 54% of the population and females 46%. Begumabad Budhana has an average literacy rate of 62%, higher than the national average of 59.5%; with 62% of the males and 38% of females literate. 15% of the population is under 6 years of age.

References

Cities and towns in Ghaziabad district, India